63rd National Board of Review Awards

Best Picture: 
 The Silence of the Lambs 
The 63rd National Board of Review Awards, honoring the best in filmmaking in 1991, were announced on 16 December 1991 and given on 24 February 1992.

Top 10 films
The Silence of the Lambs
Bugsy
Grand Canyon
Thelma & Louise
Homicide
Dead Again
Boyz N the Hood
Rambling Rose
Frankie and Johnny
Jungle Fever

Top Foreign Films
Europa Europa
The Vanishing
La Femme Nikita
My Father's Glory and My Mother's Castle
Toto le Héros

Winners
Best Picture: 
The Silence of the Lambs
Best Foreign Language Film:
Europa Europa, Germany/France
Best Actor:
Warren Beatty - Bugsy
Best Actress:
Geena Davis and Susan Sarandon - Thelma & Louise
Best Supporting Actor:
Anthony Hopkins - The Silence of the Lambs
Best Supporting Actress:
Kate Nelligan - Frankie and Johnny
Best Director:
Jonathan Demme - The Silence of the Lambs
Best Documentary:
Hearts of Darkness: A Filmmaker's Apocalypse
Special Award for Animation:
Beauty and the Beast
Career Achievement Award:
Lauren Bacall

External links
National Board of Review of Motion Pictures :: Awards for 1991

1991
1991 film awards
1991 in American cinema